Rose Murphy (April 28, 1913 – November 16, 1989) was an American jazz pianist and singer, famous for the song "Busy Line" and her unique vocal style.

Music career
She was born in Xenia, Ohio, United States. Described by AllMusic Scott Yanow as having "a unique place in music history", Murphy was known as "the chee chee girl" because of her habit of singing "chee chee" in many of her numbers. She was also known as "the girl with the pale pink voice".

Murphy began her musical career in the late 1930s, playing intermission piano for such performers as Count Basie, and became popular in the United States and United Kingdom in the late 1940s. She is best known for her high-pitched singing style, which incorporated scat singing, giggling, and percussive sound effects. "Busy Line", one of her most well-known songs, made use of perhaps her most famous vocal sound effect: the 'brrp, brrrp' of a telephone ring. A version of the song was later used in 1990 by BT Cellnet in a television commercial, which was such a success that RCA reissued the original recording. Princess Margaret became a fan after "Busy Line" became a hit in England. She attended Murphy's concerts in London, imitated her while playing the piano and sang "Busy Line" at parties.

From the 1950s to the 1980s, Murphy continued to play at many of the top clubs in New York, such as the Cookery, Michael's Pub and Upstairs At the Downstairs. She was normally accompanied by bassist Slam Stewart or Morris Edwards. These were interspersed with engagements in London and tours of Europe.

Personal life and death 
During a two-week engagement at Hollywood Roosevelt's Cinegrill in June 1989, Murphy became ill and returned to New York City. She died in New York aged 76 on November 16, 1989, and, though married four times, left no direct descendants. Her final marriage, from 1950 to 1977, was to Eddie Matthews, a businessman who, from 1928 to 1933, had been married to Ethel Waters. Rose Murphy and her radio broadcasts in the UK are referred to in the novel, Under the Pink Light, by the British author Brian Hurst.

Selected discography
Rose Murphy and Quartette (1955)Rose Murphy and QuartetteRoyale
Not Cha-Cha, but Chi-Chi (1957)Rose MurphyVerve Records
Jazz, Joy and Happiness (1962)Rose MurphyUnited Artists

References

1913 births
1989 deaths
American women jazz singers
American jazz singers
RCA Victor artists
People from Xenia, Ohio
20th-century American women pianists
20th-century American pianists
20th-century American women singers
Black & Blue Records artists
20th-century American singers